The 1963 USC Trojans baseball team represented the University of Southern California in the 1963 NCAA University Division baseball season. The team was coached Rod Dedeaux in his 22nd season.

The Trojans won the College World Series, defeating the Arizona Wildcats in the championship game.

Roster

Schedule 

! style="background:#FFCC00;color:#990000;"| Regular Season
|- valign="top" 

|- align="center" bgcolor="ddffdd"
| ||  || 11–10 || 1–0 || –
|- align="center" bgcolor="ffdddd"
| ||  || 1–4 || 1–1 || –
|- align="center" bgcolor="#ffdddd"
| March 16 ||  || 3–13 || 1–2 || 0–1
|- align="center" bgcolor="#ffdddd"
| March 16 || UCLA || 1–3 || 1–3 || 0–2
|- align="center" bgcolor="ddffdd"
| ||  || 5–4 || 2–3 || –
|- align="center" bgcolor="ddffdd"
| March 22 ||  || 4–2 || 3–3 || –
|- align="center" bgcolor="ddffdd"
| March 23 || Fresno State || 4–3 || 4–3 || –
|- align="center" bgcolor="ddffdd"
| ||  || 9–0 || 5–3 || –
|- align="center" bgcolor="ddffdd"
| ||  || 7–2 || 6–3 || –
|- align="center" bgcolor="ddffdd"
| March 30 ||  || 2–1 || 7–3 || 1–2
|- align="center" bgcolor="ddffdd"
| March 30 || Stanford || 1–0 || 8–3 || 2–2
|-

|- align="center" bgcolor="ddffdd"
| || at Long Beach State || 8–1 || 9–3 || –
|- align="center" bgcolor="ddffdd"
| || vs.  || 2–0 || 10–3 || –
|- align="center" bgcolor="ddffdd"
| || vs.  || 17–1 || 11–3 || –
|- align="center" bgcolor="ddffdd"
| || at Cal State Los Angeles || 4–1 || 12–3 || –
|- align="center" bgcolor="ddffdd"
| || vs. Cal Poly Pomona || 6–0 || 13–3 || –
|- align="center" bgcolor="ddffdd"
| ||  || 21–1 || 14–3 || –
|- align="center" bgcolor="ddffdd"
| || vs. Cal Poly Pomona || 10–2 || 15–3 || –
|- align="center" bgcolor="ddffdd"
| April 20 || vs. Cal Poly Pomona || 7–5 || 16–3 || –
|- align="center" bgcolor="ffdddd"
| ||  || 1–4 || 16–4 || –
|- align="center" bgcolor="ddffdd"
| || at San Fernando Valley State || 20–13 || 17–4 || –
|- align="center" bgcolor="ddffdd"
| || at Stanford || 2–1 || 18–4 || 3–2
|- align="center" bgcolor="ffdddd"
| || at Stanford || 3–6 || 18–5 || 3–3
|- align="center" bgcolor="ffdddd"
| || at  || 10–1 || 19–5 || 4–3
|- align="center" bgcolor="ffdddd"
| || at Santa Clara || 1–6 || 19–6 || 4–4
|- align="center" bgcolor="ddffdd"
| || at  || 3–2 || 20–6 || 5–4
|-

|- align="center" bgcolor="ddffdd"
| || at California || 4–3 || 21–6 || 6–4
|- align="center" bgcolor="ffdddd"
| || at UCLA || 2–11 || 21–7 || 6–5
|- align="center" bgcolor="ddffdd"
| May 4 || at UCLA || 1–0 || 22–7 || 7–5
|- align="center" bgcolor="ddffdd"
| ||  || 7–2 || 23–7 || –
|- align="center" bgcolor="ddffdd"
| ||  || 12–5 || 24–7 || –
|- align="center" bgcolor="ddffdd"
| || California || 6–4 || 25–7 || 8–5
|- align="center" bgcolor="ddffdd"
| || California || 11–5 || 26–7 || 9–5
|- align="center" bgcolor="ddffdd"
| || Cal State Los Angeles || 6–2 || 27–7 || –
|- align="center" bgcolor="ddffdd"
| May 17 || Santa Clara || 3–0 || 28–7 || 10–5
|- align="center" bgcolor="ffdddd"
| May 18 || Santa Clara || 4–5 || 28–8 || 10–6
|-

|-
! style="background:#FFCC00;color:#990000;"| Post–Season
|-
|-

|- align="center" bgcolor="ddffdd"
| || vs.  || 6–5 || 29–8
|- align="center" bgcolor="ffdddd"
| || vs. Oregon State || 6–8 || 29–9
|- align="center" bgcolor="ddffdd"
| || vs. Oregon State || 7–5 || 30–9
|-

|- align="center" bgcolor="ffdddd"
| June 10 || vs. Texas || Rosenblatt Stadium || 3–8 || 30–10
|- align="center" bgcolor="ddffdd"
| June 11 || vs. Holy Cross || Rosenblatt Stadium || 6–5 || 31–10
|- align="center" bgcolor="ddffdd"
| June 12 || vs. Florida State || Rosenblatt Stadium || 4–3 || 32–10
|- align="center" bgcolor="ddffdd"
| June 13 || vs. Missouri || Rosenblatt Stadium || 12–3 || 33–10
|- align="center" bgcolor="ddffdd"
| June 14 || Arizona || Rosenblatt Stadium ||  6–4 || 34–10 
|- align="center" bgcolor="ddffdd"
| June 16 || Arizona || Rosenblatt Stadium || 5–2 || 35–10 
|-

Awards and honors 
Willie Brown
 All-AAWU First Team

Bud Hollowell
 College World Series Most Outstanding Player
 All-AAWU Honorable Mention

Gary Holman
 College World Series All-Tournament Team

Walt Peterson
 College World Series All-Tournament Team
 All-America Second Team
 All-AAWU First Team

Marty Piscovich
 All-AAWU Honorable Mention

Ken Walker
 All-AAWU Honorable Mention

Kenny Washington
 College World Series All-Tournament Team

References 

USC
USC Trojans baseball seasons
College World Series seasons
NCAA Division I Baseball Championship seasons
Pac-12 Conference baseball champion seasons
USC TRojans
1963 in American sports